"Brand New" is a song by American R&B group Sista, of which a then-unknown Missy Elliott was a member. The song was released as the only promotional single for the group's 1993 album 4 All the Sistas Around da World, which was eventually shelved after the single's release.

Release and reception
The song peaked at Number 84 on the Hot R&B/Hip-Hop Singles & Tracks chart.

Track listings
12", Vinyl
"Brand New" (LP Mix) - 4:25
"Sista Bounce" - 2:33
"Brand New" (Mr. Dalvin's Ferrari Mix) - 4:00
"Brand New" (Timbaland's Beamer Mix) - 4:32

Personnel
Information taken from Discogs.
mixing – DeVante Swing, Timbaland
production – DeVante Swing, Timbaland
remixing – Mr. Dalvin, Timbaland

Chart performance

References

1994 singles
Missy Elliott songs
Song recordings produced by DeVante Swing
Song recordings produced by Timbaland
1994 songs
Elektra Records singles
Songs written by DeVante Swing
Songs written by Timbaland